The Palazzo Cesi-Gaddi war crimes archive or armoire of shame is a wooden cabinet discovered in 1994 inside a large storage room in Palazzo Cesi-Gaddi, Rome which, at the time, housed the chancellery of the military attorney's office. The cabinet contained an archive of 695 files documenting war crimes perpetrated on Italian soil under fascist rule and during Nazi occupation after the 8 September 1943 armistice between Italy and Allied armed forces. The actions described in the records spanned several years and took place in various areas of the country, from the southern city of Acerra to the northern province of Trieste and as far east as the Balkans; it remains unclear, to this day, how the archive remained concealed for so long, and who gave the order to hide the files in the immediate post-war period.

Discovery
In 1994, military prosecutor Antonino Intelisano, who was at the time in charge of the trial against former SS officer Erich Priebke, accidentally uncovered the content of the wooden cabinet, which had remained stored for decades, face to the wall, in an unused room in Palazzo Cesi. Its contents had seemingly been placed in the armoire temporarily, probably in the immediate post-war months, and forgotten or (perhaps purposely) overlooked.

The armoire contained the memorandum titled Atrocities in Italy, stamped "secret", which had been compiled by the British Secret Intelligence Service, whose officers had documented the victims' accusations and painstakingly collected depositions, and consigned it to the Italian magistrates, who failed to prosecute the individuals mentioned in the files, limiting publication of details and accusations to the cases against unnamed Nazi and fascist officers.

Information in the files led to judicial proceedings starting (or re-starting) on many specific war crimes, including:
the Sant'Anna di Stazzema massacre
the Ardeatine massacre
the Marzabotto massacre
the massacre at the Korica concentration camp
the Leros massacre
the Kos massacre
the Split massacre
the massacre at the Duomo in San Miniato
the Karpathos massacre
the massacre of the Acqui Division
the atrocities committed by Michael Seifert at the Bolzano Transit Camp

References

Bibliography
Mimmo Franzinelli.  1943-2001. , 2003. .
Franco Giustolisi. , 2004. .
, 2007. .
Daniele Biacchessi. Orazione civile per la Resistenza, Bologna, Promomusic, 2012.

External links 
L'armadio della vergogna, history of the discovery of the armoire and ample discussion of each file therein, in Italian.
“Le stragi nascoste”, spalancato l’armadio della vergogna ("Hidden massacres", opened the doors to the armoire of shame), review of the book by Franzinelli, in Italian.
Stragi nazi fasciste, per la prima volta la verità su colpevoli e insabbiamenti (Nazi-fascist massacres, for the first time the truth about culprits and pigeon-holing), "L'Espresso", September 11, 2001, in Italian.

Italian casualties of World War II
Italy in World War II
The Holocaust in Italy
Nazi war crimes in Italy